Mozilla Firefox 3.5 is a version of the Firefox web browser released in June 2009, adding a variety of new features to Firefox. Version 3.5 was touted as being twice as fast as 3.0 (due its TraceMonkey JavaScript engine and rendering improvements). It includes private browsing, has tear-off tabs, and uses the Gecko 1.9.1 engine.
It was codenamed Shiretoko during development, and was initially numbered Firefox 3.1 before Mozilla developers decided to change the version to 3.5, to reflect the inclusion of a significantly greater scope of changes than were originally planned. It is the last major version to support X BitMap images.

Estimates of Firefox 3.5's global market share in February 2010 were around 15–20% and rose rapidly in July 2009 as users migrated from Firefox 3.0. From January 2010 it began to decline as users migrated to Firefox 3.6. Both milestones involved passing Internet Explorer 7, which previously held the No. 1 and No. 3 spots in popularity according to StatCounter and Net Applications, respectively.

Due to the January 2010, well-publicized vulnerability in Microsoft's Internet Explorer browser, the German, French, and Australian governments had publicly issued warnings to Internet Explorer users to use alternative browsers, at least until a fix for the security hole was made. The first browser they recommended was Mozilla Firefox, followed by Google Chrome.

Development 
Even before the release of Firefox 3.0 on June 17, 2008, Firefox 3.1 was in development under the codename "Shiretoko". It was planned to include new interface features such as tab previews, tag auto-completion, HTML 5  tag support, and CSS text shadows.

Alpha 
The first Alpha was released on July 28, 2008. A new tab switching behavior was implemented, that switches to the most recently used tab instead of the adjacent one. When switching thumbnails are displayed so the user can preview the tabs before switching to them. The Awesomebar was also improved to have filtering by Bookmarks and history. The Gecko engine was updated to include CSS3 features and includes the HTML Canvas text API. The Alpha release showed an 18% improvement in the Acid3 test over Firefox 3.0, scoring 84/100.

Version 3.1 Alpha 2 was launched on September 5, 2008, implementing the HTML 5 video element support and preliminary support for web worker thread, enhancing the speed of some JavaScript computations.

Beta and release 
On October 14, 2008, the first beta of Firefox 3.1 was released. It included a new TraceMonkey JavaScript engine, which is not enabled by default, and the implementation of the W3C Geolocation API. Beta 2 was released on December 8, 2008 and included a new private browsing feature. The new tab switching behavior and interface was dropped at this beta, since the developer found it needed more work. Firefox 3.1 Beta 3 was released on March 12, 2009, followed by Beta 4, the first to be labeled as version 3.5, on April 27, 2009. On June 8, 2009, Mozilla released Firefox 3.5 Preview (labeled 3.5b99) in order to receive additional testing before it became the release candidate.

Release Candidate 1 was released as an update to Firefox 3.5 Preview users on June 17, 2009. Released Candidate 2 was made more widely available on June 19, 2009, followed by a third RC on June 24, 2009. Firefox 3.5 was officially released on June 30, 2009.

Features 

Firefox 3.5 uses the Gecko 1.9.1 engine, which adds features that were not included in the 3.0 release. These include support for the <video> and <audio> elements defined in the HTML 5 draft specification, including native support for Ogg Theora encoded video and Vorbis encoded audio. The goal is to offer video and audio playback without being encumbered by patent issues associated with most plugin and codec technologies. Other features new in Firefox 3.5 include a private browsing mode, native support for JSON and web worker threads, and many other new web technologies. Multi-touch support was also added to the release, including gesture support like pinching for zooming and swiping for back and forward. Firefox 3.5 also features an updated logo from the previous releases.

A minor change for Version 3.5 is the default search engine in Russian language builds, which uses the search engine Yandex rather than Google, after a survey of Russian Firefox users indicated they preferred Yandex.

The first update, 3.5.1, was released on July 16, 2009. It solved some vulnerabilities detected after the final release. Another update, 3.5.2, was released on August 3, 2009, followed by version 3.5.3 on September 9, 2009, version 3.5.4 on October 27, 2009, version 3.5.5 on November 5, 2009, version 3.5.6 on December 15, 2009 and version 3.5.7 on January 5, 2010.

Starting July 14, 2009, the upgrade to 3.5 was offered to users of Firefox 3.0 through the automatic internal "push" update mechanism.

End of life 
Security and stability updates for Firefox 3.5.x were scheduled to end in August 2010. However, Firefox 3.5.12 was released on September 7, 2010 and Mozilla continued shipping incremental stability and security fixes up to build 3.5.19, released on April 28, 2011. With the release of Firefox 3.6.18, Mozilla issued an update to move remaining Firefox 3.5 users to the new browser, finally ending support for 3.5.

See also 
 History of Firefox

References

External links 
 Mozilla.com, Mozilla Firefox homepage for end-users
 Mozilla.org, Mozilla Firefox project page for developers
 Mozilla.com, Mozilla EULA
 Mozilla Firefox 3.5.19 Download link (FTP)
 
 
 Technologizer.com, Review of Firefox 3.5
 Computerworld.com, Review of Firefox 3.5

3.5
2009 software
Free software programmed in C++
Gopher clients
History of web browsers
Linux web browsers
MacOS web browsers
POSIX web browsers
Unix Internet software
Windows web browsers
Software that uses XUL

es:Historia de Firefox#Versión 3.5